Mount Feola is a mountain rising to  at the head of Denton Glacier in the Asgard Range of Victoria Land, Antarctica. It was named by the Advisory Committee on Antarctic Names (1997) for Samuel D. Feola, a helicopter pilot with U.S. Navy Squadron VXE-6, principally flying in the McMurdo Dry Valleys, 1976 and 1977. From 1990 to the time of naming he was Director Logistics, Antarctic Support Associates, responsible for contractor planning, management, and operations of logistic and operational support requirements for the National Science Foundation's U.S. Antarctic Program.

References 

Mountains of the Asgard Range
McMurdo Dry Valleys